Vassilios or Vassileios, also transliterated Vasileios, Vasilios, Vassilis or Vasilis, is a Greek given name, the origin of Basil. In ancient/medieval/Byzantine context, it is also transliterated as Basileios. It is directly descended from the word "King", . It descends from the Greek language.

People

Vassilis Alexakis, Greek-French writer
Vassilis Andrianopoulos, Greek footballer
Vasilis Avlonitis, Greek actor
Vasilis Avramidis, Greek footballer
Vasilis Barkas, Greek footballer
Vasilis Bolanos, ethnic Greek mayor of Himara, Albania
Vassilis Borbokis, Greek footballer
Vasilis Dimitriadis, Greek footballer
Vasilis Fragkias, Greek basketball coach
Vassilis Gagatsis, president of the Hellenic Football Federation
Vasilis Georgiadis, Greek film director and actor
Vasilis Golias, Greek footballer
Vassilis Hatzipanagis, Greek footballer
Vassilios Iliadis, Greek judoka
Vasilios Kalogeracos, Australian footballer of Greek descent
Vasili Kanidiadis, Greek-Australian television personality
Vassilis Karapialis, Greek footballer
Vasilis Karras, Greek folk singer
Vasilis Katsaros, Greek footballer
Vassilis Kikilias, Greek basketball player
Vasilis Konstantinou, Greek footballer
Vassilios Kotronias, Greek chess grandmaster and chess author
Vasilios Koutsianikoulis, Greek footballer
Vassilis Krommidas, Greek triathlete
Vassilis Lakis, Greek footballer
Vassilis Leventis, Greek politician and TV persona
Vasilis Lipiridis, Greek basketball player

Vassilis Logothetidis, Greek actor
Vassilis Lymberis, Greek mass murderer
Vasilios Magginas, Greek politician
Vasilis Michaelides, Cypriot poet
Vassilis Mitilinaios, Greek footballer
Vasilis N. Triantafillidis, birth name of Greek comedian Harry Klynn
Vassilis Paleokostas, Greek fugitive criminal
Vasilis Papakonstantinou, Greek singer
Vassilis Papazachos, Greek seismologist
Vassilis Photopoulos, Greek painter, film director, art director and set designer
Vasilis Politis (born 1963), Greek philosopher
Vassilis Rapotikas, ethnic Aromanian separatist and revolutionary from Greece
Vassilis Saleas, Greek musician
Vassilis Simtsak, Greek basketball player
Vassilios Skouris, 10th President of the European Court of Justice
Vassilis Spanoulis, Greek basketball player
Vassilis Steriadis, Greek poet and critic
Vassilis Stravopodis, Greek footballer
Vassilis Tsabropoulos, Greek musician and composer
Vasilis Torosidis, Greek footballer
Vassilios Tsiartas, Greek footballer
Vassilis Tsitsanis, Greek songwriter and musician
Vassilis Vassili, Greek sculptor
Vassilis Vassilikos, Greek writer and diplomat
Vasilios Vatatzes, Greek scholar, merchant, traveler, pioneer explorer and diplomat
Vasilis Xanthopoulos, Greek basketball player
Vasilios Xydas, Greek pole vaulter

Places
 Agios Vasileios, a Greek village in Achaea
 Agios Vasileios, a Greek village in Corinthia
St. Vasilios Church (Massachusetts)

See also
Vassiliki (given name)
Basil (name)

Greek masculine given names